Sant'Angelo di Brolo (Sicilian: Sant'Àncilu di Brolu) is a comune (municipality) in the Metropolitan City of Messina in the Italian region Sicily, located about  east of Palermo and about  west of Messina.  
Sant'Angelo di Brolo borders the following municipalities: Ficarra, Raccuja, San Piero Patti, Piraino, Brolo, Gioiosa Marea, Librizzi, Montagnareale, Sinagra.

Notable people
 Vincenzo Natoli (1690–1770), judge and marquess
 Emanuele Curcio (born 1953), former professional football player

References

Cities and towns in Sicily